Beatniks were members of a social movement in the 1950s who subscribed to an anti-materialistic lifestyle.

History

In 1948, Jack Kerouac introduced the phrase "Beat Generation", generalizing from his social circle to characterize the underground, anticonformist youth gathering in New York at that time. The name came up in conversation with John Clellon Holmes, who published an early Beat Generation novel titled Go (1952), along with the manifesto This Is the Beat Generation in The New York Times Magazine. In 1954, Nolan Miller published his third novel Why I Am So Beat (Putnam), detailing the weekend parties of four students.

"Beat" came from underworld slang—the world of hustlers, drug addicts, and petty thieves—from which Allen Ginsberg and Kerouac sought inspiration. "Beat" was slang for "beaten down" or "downtrodden", but to Kerouac and Ginsberg, it also had a spiritual connotation as in "beatitude". Other adjectives discussed by Holmes and Kerouac were "found" and "furtive". Kerouac felt he had identified (and was the embodiment of) a new trend analogous to the influential Lost Generation.

In "Aftermath: The Philosophy of the Beat Generation," Kerouac criticized what he saw as a distortion of his visionary, spiritual ideas:

The Beat Generation, that was a vision that we had, John Clellon Holmes and I, and Allen Ginsberg in an even wilder way, in the late Forties, of a generation of crazy, illuminated hipsters suddenly rising and roaming America, serious, bumming and hitchhiking everywhere, ragged, beatific, beautiful in an ugly graceful new way—a vision gleaned from the way we had heard the word "beat" spoken on street corners on Times Square and in the Village, in other cities in the downtown city night of postwar America—beat, meaning down and out but full of intense conviction. We'd even heard old 1910 Daddy Hipsters of the streets speak the word that way, with a melancholy sneer. It never meant juvenile delinquents, it meant characters of a special spirituality who didn't gang up but were solitary Bartlebies staring out the dead wall window of our civilization ...

Kerouac explained what he meant by "beat" at a Brandeis Forum, "Is There A Beat Generation?", on November 8, 1958, at New York's Hunter College Playhouse. The seminar's panelists were Kerouac, James A. Wechsler, Princeton anthropologist Ashley Montagu and author Kingsley Amis. Wechsler, Montagu, and Amis wore suits, while Kerouac was clad in black jeans, ankle boots and a checkered shirt. Reading from a prepared text, Kerouac reflected on his beat beginnings:

It is because I am Beat, that is, I believe in beatitude and that God so loved the world that He gave His only begotten son to it ... Who knows, but that the universe is not one vast sea of compassion actually, the veritable holy honey, beneath all this show of personality and cruelty?

Kerouac's statement was later published as "The Origins of the Beat Generation" (Playboy, June 1959). In that article, Kerouac noted how his original beatific philosophy had been ignored amid maneuvers by several pundits, among them San Francisco newspaper columnist Herb Caen, to alter Kerouac's concept with jokes and jargon:

I went one afternoon to the church of my childhood and had a vision of what I must have really meant with "Beat"... the vision of the word Beat as being to mean beatific ... People began to call themselves beatniks, beats, jazzniks, bopniks, buggies, and finally, I was called the "avatar" of all this.

In light of what he considered beat to mean and what beatnik had come to mean, Kerouac once observed to a reporter, "I'm not a beatnik, I'm a Catholic", showing the reporter a painting of Pope Paul VI and saying, "You know who painted that? Me."

Stereotype

In her memoir, Minor Characters, Joyce Johnson described how the stereotype was absorbed into American culture:

Kerouac biographer Ann Charters noted that the term "Beat" was appropriated to become a Madison Avenue marketing tool:

Lee Streiff, an acquaintance of many members of the movement who went on to become one of its chroniclers, believed that the news media saddled the movement for the long term with a set of false images:

Etymology
The origin of the word "beatnik" is traditionally ascribed to Herb Caen from his column in the San Francisco Chronicle on April 2, 1958, where he wrote "Look magazine, preparing a picture spread on S.F.'s Beat Generation (oh, no, not AGAIN!), hosted a party in a No. Beach house for 50 Beatniks, and by the time word got around the sour grapevine, over 250 bearded cats and kits were on hand, slopping up Mike Cowles' free booze. They're only Beat, y'know, when it comes to work ..." It is claimed that Caen coined the term by adding the Yiddish suffix -nik to Beat as in the Beat Generation.

However an earlier source from 1954, or possibly 1957 after the launch of Sputnik, is ascribed to Ethel (Etya) Gechtoff, the well-known owner of a San Francisco Art Gallery.

Objecting to the term, Allen Ginsberg wrote to The New York Times to deplore "the foul word beatnik," commenting, "If beatniks and not illuminated Beat poets overrun this country, they will have been created not by Kerouac but by industries of mass communication which continue to brainwash man."

Beat culture
In the vernacular of the period, "Beat" referred to Beat culture, attitude and literature; while "beatnik" referred to a stereotype found in cartoon drawings and (in some cases at worst) twisted, sometimes violent media characters. In 1995, film scholar Ray Carney wrote about the authentic beat attitude as differentiated from stereotypical media portrayals of the beatnik:
Much of Beat culture represented a negative stance rather than a positive one. It was animated more by a vague feeling of cultural and emotional displacement, dissatisfaction, and yearning, than by a specific purpose or program ... It was many different, conflicting, shifting states of mind.

Since 1958, the terms Beat Generation and Beat have been used to describe the antimaterialistic literary movement that began with Kerouac in the 1940s and continued into the 1960s. The Beat philosophy of antimaterialism and soul searching influenced 1960s musicians such as Bob Dylan, the early Pink Floyd and The Beatles.

However, the soundtrack of the beat movement was the modern jazz pioneered by saxophonist Charlie Parker and trumpeter Dizzy Gillespie, which the media dubbed bebop.  Jack Kerouac and Allen Ginsberg spent much of their time in New York jazz clubs such as the Royal Roost, Minton's Playhouse, Birdland and the Open Door, "shooting the breeze" and "digging the music". Charlie Parker, Dizzy Gillespie and Miles Davis rapidly became what Ginsberg dubbed "secret heroes" to this group of aesthetes. The Beat authors borrowed much from the jazz/hipster slang of the 1940s, peppering their works with words such as "square", "cats", "cool" and "dig".

At the time the term "beatnik" was coined, a trend existed among young college students to adopt the stereotype. Men emulated the trademark look of bebop trumpeter Dizzy Gillespie by wearing goatees, horn-rimmed glasses and berets, rolling their own cigarettes, and playing bongos. Fashions for women included black leotards and long, straight, unadorned hair, in a rebellion against the middle-class culture of beauty salons. Marijuana use was associated with the subculture, and during the 1950s, Aldous Huxley's The Doors of Perception further influenced views on drugs.

By 1960, a small "beatnik" group in Newquay, Cornwall, England (including a young Wizz Jones) had attracted the attention and abhorrence of their neighbours for growing their hair beyond shoulder length, resulting in a television interview with Alan Whicker on BBC television's Tonight series.

The Beat philosophy was generally countercultural and antimaterialistic, and stressed the importance of bettering one's inner self over material possessions. Some Beat writers, such as Gary Snyder, began to delve into Eastern religions such as Buddhism and Taoism. Politics tended to be liberal, left-wing and anti-war, with support for causes such as desegregation (although many of the figures associated with the original Beat movement, particularly Kerouac, embraced libertarian and conservative ideas). An openness to African American culture and arts was apparent in literature and music, notably jazz. While Caen and other writers implied a connection with communism, no obvious or direct connection occurred between Beat philosophy, as expressed by the literary movement's leading authors, and that of the communist movement, other than the antipathy both philosophies shared towards capitalism. Those with only a superficial familiarity with the Beat movement often saw this similarity and assumed the two movements had more in common.

The Beat movement introduced Asian religions to Western society.  These religions provided the Beat generation with new views of the world and corresponded with its desire to rebel against conservative middle-class values of the 1950s, old post-1930s radicalism, mainstream culture, and institutional religions in America.

By 1958, many Beat writers published writings on Buddhism. This was the year Jack Kerouac published his novel The Dharma Bums, whose central character (whom Kerouac based on himself) sought Buddhist contexts for events in his life.

Allen Ginsberg's spiritual journey to India in 1963 also influenced the Beat movement. After studying religious texts alongside monks, Ginsberg deduced that what linked the function of poetry to Asian religions was their mutual goal of achieving ultimate truth. His discovery of Hindu mantra chants, a form of oral delivery, subsequently influenced Beat poetry. Beat pioneers who followed a Buddhism-influenced spiritual path felt that Asian religions offered a profound understanding of human nature and insights into the being, existence and reality of mankind. Many of the Beat advocates believed that the core concepts of Asian religious philosophies had the means of elevating American society's consciousness, and these concepts informed their main ideologies.

Notable Beat writers such as Kerouac, Ginsberg, and Gary Snyder were drawn to Buddhism to the extent that they each, at different periods in their lives, followed a spiritual path in their quests to provide answers to universal questions and concepts. As a result, the Beat philosophy stressed the bettering of the inner self and the rejection of materialism, and postulated that East Asian religions could fill a religious and spiritual void in the lives of many Americans.

Many scholars speculate that Beat writers wrote about Eastern religions to encourage young people to practice spiritual and sociopolitical action. Progressive concepts from these religions, particularly those regarding personal freedom, influenced youth culture to challenge capitalist domination, break their generation's dogmas, and reject traditional gender and racial rules.

Beatnik art
Beatnik art is the direction of contemporary art that originated in the United States as part of the beat movement in the 1960s. The movement itself, unlike the so-called "lost generation" did not set itself the task of changing society, but tried to distance itself from it, while at the same time trying to create its own counter-culture. The art created by artists was influenced by jazz, drugs, occultism, and other attributes of beat movement.

The scope of the activity was concentrated in the cultural circles of New York, Los Angeles, San Francisco and North Carolina. Prominent representatives of the trend were artists Wallace Berman, Jay DeFeo, Jess Collins, Robert Frank, Claes Oldenburg and Larry Rivers.

The culture of the beat generation has become a kind of intersection for representatives of the creative intellect of the United States associated with visual and performing art, which are usually attributed to other areas and trends of artistic expression, such as assemblage, happening, funk art and neo-dadaism. They made efforts to destroy the wall between art and real life, so that art would become a living experience in cafes or jazz clubs, and not remain the prerogative of galleries and museums. Many works of artists of the movement were created on the verge of various types of art.

Artists wrote poetry and poets painted, something like this can describe the processes taking place within the framework of the movement. Performances were a key element in the art of beats, whether it was the Theatrical Event of 1952 at Black Mountain College or Jack Kerouac typing in 1951 the novel On the Road on a typewriter in a single session on a single roll of 31 meter long paper.

Representatives of the movement were united by hostility to traditional culture with its conformism and brightly degenerate commercial component. They also did not like the approach of traditional culture to hushing up the dark side of American life - violence, corruption, social inequality, racism. They tried through art to create a new way of life based on the ideals of rebellion and freedom.

Critics highlight the artist Wallace Berman as the main representative of the movement. In his work concentrated many of the characteristic features of hipsters, especially in his collages made on photocopied photographs, which are a mixture of elements of pop art and mysticism. Among other artists and works, one can single out the work The Rose by the artist Jay DeFeo, the work on which was carried out for seven years, a huge painting-assembly weighing about a ton with a width of up to 20 centimeters.

Beatniks in media
   

Possibly the first film portrayal of the Beat society was in the 1950 noir film D.O.A, directed by Rudolph Maté. In the film the main character goes to a loud San Francisco bar, where one woman shouts to the musicians: "Cool! Cool! Really cool!"  One of the characters says, "Man, am I really hip", and another replies, "You're from nowhere, nowhere!"  Lone dancers are seen moving to the beat. Some are dressed with accessories and have hairstyles that one would expect to see in much later films. Typical 1940s attire is mixed with beatnik clothing styles, particularly in one male who has a beatnik hat, long hair, and a mustache and goatee, but is still wearing a dress suit. The bartender refers to a patron as "Jive Crazy" and talks of the music driving its followers crazy. He then tells one man to "Calm down Jack!" and the man replies, "Oh don't bother me, man. I'm being enlightened!".  The scene also demonstrates the connection to and influence of 1940s genres of African American music such as Bebop on the emergence of Beat culture.  The featured band "Jive" is all-black, while the customers who express their appreciation for the music in a jargon that would come to characterize the stereotype of Beat culture are young white hipsters.
The 1953 Dalton Trumbo film Roman Holiday starring Audrey Hepburn and Gregory Peck features a supporting character played by Eddie Albert that is a stereotypical beatnik, appearing five years before the term was coined. He has an Eastern European surname, Radovich, and is a promiscuous photographer who wears baggy clothes, a striped T-shirt and a beard, which is mentioned four times in the screenplay.
The 1954 film White Christmas features a beatnik themed dance number called "Choreography".
Stanley Donen brought the theme to the film musical in Funny Face (1957) with one Audrey Hepburn production number revamped into a Gap commercial in 2006. One of Jerry Yulsman's photographs of Kerouac was altered for use in a Gap print ad, in which Joyce Johnson was omitted from the image.
Another film involving beatnik culture is Roger Corman's 1959 black comedy A Bucket of Blood, written by Charles B. Griffith.  In the film, a coffee house busboy longs for acceptance by the beatnik patrons, so he develops a style of sculpture using dead animals and people. An influential character in the film is the beatnik poet, who convinces the group to accept the busboy as a significant artist. 
The character Maynard G. Krebs, played on TV by Bob Denver in The Many Loves of Dobie Gillis (1959–63), solidified the stereotype of the indolent non-conformist beatnik, which contrasted with the aggressively rebellious Beat-related images presented by popular film actors of the early and mid-1950s, notably Marlon Brando and James Dean.
High School Confidential (1958) features a beatnik girl played by Phillipa Fallon who recites a nihilistic beat poem, High School Drag.
The Beat Generation (1959) made an association of the movement with crime and violence, as did The Beatniks (1960). 
An episode of Alfred Hitchcock Presents, titled A Night with the Boys, broadcast 10 May 1959, features Hitchcock introducing and closing the episode dressed as a beatnik, and using beat slang. 
The 1960 Jerry Lewis film Visit to a Small Planet, based on a satirical Gore Vidal play, features Lewis as an alien who entrances beatniks at a nightclub ("We don't use floors... we use fog") and who appears to understand a scat song as being in an intelligible language.
The Looney Tunes cartoon character Cool Cat is often portrayed as a beatnik, as is the banty rooster in the 1963 Foghorn Leghorn short Banty Raids. 
Similarly, the Beany and Cecil cartoon series also had a beatnik character, Go Man Van Gogh (aka "The Wildman"), who often lives in the jungle and paints various pictures and backgrounds to fool his enemies, first appearing in the episode, "The Wildman of Wildsville". 
Hanna Barbera's series Top Cat features Spook, a beatnik cat; and their series Scooby-Doo features a beatnik character Shaggy. 
Two beatniks (played by Ric Ocasek of The Cars and Pia Zadora) painted furiously and played bongos in John Waters' 1988 Hairspray.
An episode of The Addams Family, titled The Addams Family Meets a Beatnik, broadcast 1 January 1965, features a young biker/beatnik who injures himself in an accident, and ends up staying with the Addams Family. 
Beat coffeehouses are depicted in The Flower Drum Song (1961), Take Her, She's Mine (1964), American Pop (1981), Absolute Beginners (1986), So I Married an Axe Murderer (1993),   The Hudsucker Proxy (1994),  An Extremely Goofy Movie (2000) and episode six, "Babylon", of Mad Men (2007).
Two Beatnik-related films were riffed on the cult TV series Mystery Science Theater 3000: 1960's The Beatniks and 1959's The Rebel Set.
Carolyn Jones in A Hole in the Head (1959) played a beatnik character.
An episode of The Detectives, titled "Tobey's Place" broadcast 29th September 1961, features Adam West's character, Sgt. Steve Nelson, fraternising with beatniks at a waterfront hang-out, where he also reads aloud his own poetry. For this, he receives admonishments and mockery from his colleagues on the police force.
In the Season 9 episode of My Little Pony: Friendship is Magic, Sweet and Smokey, Spike's dragon bully Garble is revealed to be a Beatnik poet.

Beatnik books
Alan Bisbort's survey, Beatniks: A Guide to an American Subculture, was published by Greenwood Press in 2009 as part of the Greenwood Press Guides to Subcultures and Countercultures series. The book includes a timeline, a glossary and biographical sketches. Others in the Greenwood series: Punks, Hippies, Goths and Flappers.

Tales of Beatnik Glory: Volumes I and II, by Ed Sanders, is, as its name suggests, a collection of short stories, and a definitive introduction to the beatnik scene as lived by its participants. The author, who went on to found the Fugs, lived in the beatnik epicenter of Greenwich Village and the Lower East Side in the late 1950s and early 1960s.

Among the humor books, Beat, Beat, Beat was a 1959 Signet paperback of cartoons by Phi Beta Kappa Princeton graduate William F. Brown, who looked down on the movement from his position in the TV department of the Batten, Barton, Durstine & Osborn advertising agency.

Suzuki Beane (1961), by Sandra Scoppettone with Louise Fitzhugh illustrations, was a Bleecker Street beatnik spoof of Kay Thompson's Eloise series (1956–59).

In the 1960s, the comic book Justice League of America's sidekick Snapper Carr was also portrayed as a stereotypical beatnik, down to his lingo and clothes. The DC Comics character Jonny Double is also portrayed as a beatnik.

Museums
In San Francisco, Jerry and Estelle Cimino operate their Beat Museum, which began in 2003 in Monterey, California, and moved to San Francisco in 2006.

Ed "Big Daddy" Roth used fiberglass to build his Beatnik Bandit in 1960. Today, this car is in the National Automobile Museum in Reno, Nevada.

See also
 Beat Generation
 Cool
 Hippie
 Moody Street Irregulars
 Silent Generation
 Subcultures of the 1950s
 Yves Saint Laurent (designer)

References

Sources
 Charters, Ann (ed.). The Portable Beat Reader. Penguin Books. New York. 1992.  (hc);   (pbk)
Nash, Catherine. "The Beat Generation and American Culture." (PDF file)
 Phillips, Lisa (ed). Beat Culture and the New America: 1950-1965. New York: Whitney Museum of Art and Paris: Flammarion, 1995.

External links

 The Beat Museum
 Kerouac.net
 John Sinclair, "The Last Beatnik Warrior Poet"
 Philament: "Beat Etymologies"
 This is the Beat Generation
 Beatniks on film and TV
 Beats In Kansas - the Beat Generation in the Heartland
 San Francisco beatniks and hipsters, 1950s, links to Denver and Neal Cassady sites

 

1950s neologisms
Beat Generation
Counterculture
Culture of New York City
Culture of San Francisco
Drug culture
History of subcultures
Musical subcultures
North Beach, San Francisco
Social groups
Stereotypes
Social movements in the United States